The Spencer Sisters is a Canadian drama series that premiered January 29, 2023 on CTV. The series stars Lea Thompson and Stacey Farber as Victoria and Darby Spencer, a mother and daughter duo who are thrust into investigating crimes in their home town of Alder Bluffs.

Premise
Mystery novelist Victoria Spencer and her daughter Darby Spencer who are mistaken as sisters, tackle puzzling cases in the fictional town of Alder Bluffs.

Cast and Characters

Main
 Lea Thompson as Victoria Spencer, mother
 Stacey Farber as Darby Spencer, daughter

Recurring
 Thomas Antony Olajide as Zane Graham, Darby’s high school best friend and Alder Bluffs cop
 Edward Ruttle as Doctor Lucas Collins, Darby’s high school flame
 Husein Madhavji as Alastair Dhumal, Victoria's "IT Consultant" (aka hacker)
 Ayesha Mansur Gonsalves as Sarita Stark, Victoria's feisty literary agent
 Rodrigo Massa as Antonio Pereira, Zane's husband
 Kaitlyn Leeb as Lindsay Yip, a hotshot lawyer who is Lucas' fiancée
 Adam Hurtig as the lead detective of the Alder Bluff's police force

Guest appearances by Samuel Wexler, Paul Popowich, Andrew Bushell, Cindy Sampson, Seán Cullen, Matt Wells, Alex Ozerov, Jennifer Hui, Nancy Sorel, Mercedes Morris, Julius Cho, Mika Amonsen, Daniel Kash, Paul Essiembre, Tova Epp, Zarrin Darnell-Martin and Hazel Venzon.

Episodes

Production

Filming 
The series was shot in summer 2022 in various locations in southern Manitoba.At least one episode was partially filmed in Dundas Ontario Canada

References

External links

2020s Canadian drama television series
CTV Television Network original programming
Television shows filmed in Manitoba
2023 Canadian television series debuts